The 2013–14 GFF National Super League is the 14th season of the highest competitive football league in Guyana, after it was founded in 1990.

Teams

League table

References

GFF Elite League seasons
Guyana
football
football